Brent Andrew Mickelberg (born 3 October 1981) is an Australian politician. He has been the Liberal National Party member for Buderim in the Queensland Legislative Assembly since 2017.

Mickelberg served in the Australian Army as an infantry officer. During that time, he deployed to East Timor, Afghanistan and worked on border protection operations.

References

1981 births
Living people
Members of the Queensland Legislative Assembly
Liberal National Party of Queensland politicians
People from Brisbane
21st-century Australian politicians